VA248 may refer to:
 Ariane flight VA248, an Ariane 5 launch that occurred on 20 June 2019
 Virgin Australia flight 248, with IATA flight number VA248
 Virginia State Route 248 (VA-248), a primary state highway in the United States